Anita O'Day Sings the Winners is a 1958 album by Anita O'Day.

The concept of this album was to pick the "winners" from the top Jazz and Orchestral Charts.

Track listing
"Take the "A" Train" (Billy Strayhorn, Duke Ellington) - 2:48
"Tenderly" (Walter Gross, Jack Lawrence) - 2:38
"A Night in Tunisia" (Dizzy Gillespie) - 2:35
"Four" (Miles Davis) - 2:48
"Early Autumn" (Ralph Burns, Woody Herman, Johnny Mercer) - 3:08
"Four Brothers" (Jimmy Giuffre) - 2:23
"Sing, Sing, Sing" (Louis Prima) - 3:29
"My Funny Valentine" (Richard Rodgers, Lorenz Hart) - 3:34
"Frenesi" (Alberto Dominguez, Leonard Whitcup) - 3:01
"Body and Soul" (Edward Heyman, Robert Sour, Frank Eyton, Johnny Green) - 3:20 
"What's Your Story Morning Glory?" (Jack Lawrence, Paul Francis Webster, Mary Lou Williams) - 3:47
"Peanut Vendor" (L. Wolfe Gilbert, Moisés Simóns, Marion Sunshine) - 2:38

Personnel
Anita O'Day - vocals
Marty Paich - arranger and conductor, tracks 1 - 6
Russell Garcia - arranger and conductor, tracks 7 - 12

References

1958 albums
Anita O'Day albums
Verve Records albums
Albums arranged by Russell Garcia (composer)
Albums arranged by Marty Paich
Albums produced by Norman Granz
Albums produced by Anita O'Day